Wenshan Tram is a tram system serving Qiubei County, Wenshan Prefecture, Yunnan, China.

Lines in operation

Line 4
Line 4 consists of a main line with 8 stops and branch line with 3 stops. Most of the route is grade separated. The trams are powered through a combination of batteries and supercapacitors, which negates the need for continuous overhead line outside of halts. The rolling stock consists of 15 low-floor trams built by CRRC Zhuzhou. The network opened on 15 May 2021.

Route 
The tram connects the urban center of Qiubei and the Puzhehei Tourist Service Center to Puzhehei railway station on the Nanning–Kunming high-speed railway.

References 

Tram transport in China
Transport in Yunnan
Wenshan Zhuang and Miao Autonomous Prefecture
Rapid transit in China
Railway lines opened in 2021